In Music We Trust is a music webzine, publicity company, and record label based in Portland, Oregon. It was established as a webzine in July 1997 by Alex Steininger and his friend Ryan O'Neill. Its original goal was to help promote work by new artists. Steininger founded the website after losing his job at another online magazine, when he contacted O'Neill for his web design expertise and asked him for help. The website was named a "cool site" by the Open Directory Project.

Record label
In 2001, Steininger started In Music We Trust Records; its first release was Sean Croghan's debut solo album. That year, the Willamette Week reported that "In just a few short years of music obsession, Steininger has transformed himself into a dynamo of Portland's music scene, releasing albums by local supremos Luther Russell, Sean Croghan and Joe Davis." In 2004, the label released Matt Sharp's debut solo album, making it their biggest release to date at the time.

Artists
Notable artists who have released one or more albums on In Music We Trust Records include:
Casey Neill
Grand Champeen
Hillstomp
I Can Lick Any Sonofabitch in the House
Luther Russell
Matt Sharp
Ruth Ruth

References

External links

Internet properties established in 1997
Online music magazines published in the United States
Companies based in Portland, Oregon
1997 establishments in Oregon
Privately held companies based in Oregon